Acallistus cuprescens is a species of ground beetle in the subfamily Broscinae. It was described by Thomas Gibson Sloane in 1920 and is an endemic species found in Tasmania, Australia.

References

Beetles described in 1920
Beetles of Australia
Broscini